Anne Mall (born December 10, 1974) is a former professional tennis player from the United States. In Fed Cup, however, she played for Ireland.

Biography
The daughter of Ben and Peggy Mall, she is originally from Libertyville, Illinois. In 1988 the family moved to Orange County, California and she attended Dana Hills High School.

Mall debuted on the WTA Tour as a 16 year old in 1991, partnering Lindsay Davenport in the doubles at San Diego. At the 1991 US Open she upset top seed Kristin Godridge in the first round of the girls' singles, en route to a spot in the final, which she lost to Czechoslovakian player Karina Habšudová.

In 1993, she began touring professionally. With WTA Tour match-wins over Katrina Adams, Laura Glitz, Catalina Cristea, Audra Keller and Paola Suárez, her ranking reached a career best 139 in the world in August, 1994. She was granted a wild card into the main draw of the women's singles at the 1994 US Open and was drawn up against world number one Steffi Graf on Louis Armstrong Stadium in the opening round, losing to the German 2–6, 1–6.

Initially retiring from professional tennis in 1997, Mall studied for a degree at UCSD, before making a comeback at the age of 29. In 2004 she won five ITF doubles titles. She began representing the Ireland Fed Cup team in 2005, having qualified through her Irish born grandmother. She featured in four ties in 2005, then another two in 2008.

After retiring from tennis for a second time, Mall began a career in real estate and currently runs her own real estate brokerage in Chicago, Illinois.

ITF finals

Singles (2–2)

Doubles (7–1)

References

External links
 
 
 

1974 births
Living people
American female tennis players
Irish female tennis players
American people of Irish descent
Tennis people from Illinois
University of California, San Diego alumni
21st-century American women